IGTV, short for Instagram TV, was a standalone video application by Instagram for Android and iOS smartphones. It allowed for longer videos compared to Instagram feeds. IGTV was available as a stand-alone app, though basic functionality was also available within the Instagram app and website.

The service was launched and introduced by former Instagram CEO Kevin Systrom in a live event in San Francisco on June 20, 2018, featuring creators such as Lele Pons.

On 1 March 2022 Instagram's parent company, Meta, announced the shutdown of IGTV, due to their focus on Instagram Reels. The app was removed from app stores in mid-March, and all IGTV videos were then merged into the Instagram app.

Service 
IGTV required users to login with an Instagram account. Mobile devices allowed uploads of up to 15 minutes in length with a file size of up to 650 MB, while desktop web browsers allowed uploads of up to 60 minutes in length with a file size of up to 3.6 GB. The app auto-played videos as soon as it was launched, which Kevin Systrom contrasted to video hosts where one must first locate a video.

Instagram accounts with an IGTV channel received an IGTV tab on their profile page. Additionally, uploads on IGTV could be mirrored to a linked Facebook page.

In May 2019, IGTV gained the ability to upload landscape videos.

References 

2018 software
2018 introductions
2018 establishments in California
IOS software
Mobile software
Proprietary cross-platform software
Social software
Video software
Instagram
Vertical video